KCUG may refer to:

 KCUG-LP, a low-power radio station (100.3 FM) licensed to serve Omaha, Nebraska, United States
 KHAN (FM), a defunct radio station (99.7 FM) formerly licensed to serve Medicine Bow, Wyoming, United States, which held the call sign KCUG from 2005 to April 2006 and from September 2006 to 2008